Qohurd-e Olya (also Romanized as Qohūrd-e ‘Olyā; also known as Ghohordé Olya, Khokhūrd Bāla, Qohord, Qohord-e Bālā, and Qohord-e ‘Olyā) is a village in Mehraban-e Sofla Rural District, Gol Tappeh District, Kabudarahang County, Hamadan Province, Iran. At the 2006 census, its population was 944, in 237 families.

References 

Populated places in Kabudarahang County